Den store barnedåpen  (The Great Christening) is a 1931 Norwegian comedy film.

It was directed by Tancred Ibsen and featured Einar Sissener, Aase Bye and Unni Torkildsen.

It was the first feature-length Norwegian sound film. It was based on the 1925 play of the same name written by  Oskar Braaten (1881–1939).
The lacklustre Harald (Sissener) is taken in by Alvilde (Bye), and charged with looking after her bastard child. It soon dawns on both of them that Harald has more potential than previously assumed.

Cast

References

External links
 
 
 Den store barnedåpen at the Norwegian Film Institute

1931 films
1931 comedy films
Films directed by Tancred Ibsen
Norwegian black-and-white films
Norwegian comedy films
1930s Norwegian-language films